Asbjørn Larsen (born 1 August 1936) is a Norwegian economist and industrial leader.

Larsen was born in Porsgrunn. He graduated from the Norwegian School of Economics in 1960. He was assigned with Ministry of Foreign Affairs from 1961 to 1965, and the Norwegian Shipowners' Association from 1966 to 1973. He was CEO of the petroleum company Saga Petroleum from 1979 to 1998. He became a member of the Norwegian Academy of Technological Sciences from 1993. He was decorated Knight, First Class of the Order of St. Olav in 1993.

References

1936 births
Living people
People from Porsgrunn
Norwegian economists
Norwegian School of Economics alumni
Members of the Norwegian Academy of Technological Sciences